Naura may refer to:

 Naura, India, a town in the Nawanshahr district of Punjab
 Naura Ayu (born 2005),  Indonesian singer
 Michael Naura (1934–2017), German jazz pianist, journalist and radio presenter; see 
 Naura, a port city on the Malabar Coast of India
 Haigwai language or Naura, an Austronesian language, spoken in Papua New Guinea
 Narew (Lithuanian: Naura), a river in Poland

See also 
 Na'ura
 Nauru
 Nauru (disambiguation)